Lethrinops gossei is a species of cichlid endemic to Lake Malawi where it is usually found in deep waters with muddy substrates in the southern portion of the lake.  This species grows to a length of  SL.

Etymology
The specific name honours the Belgian zoologist Jean-Pierre Gosse (1924–2001), who was the curator of vertebrates at the Institut Royal des Sciences Naturelles de Belgique.

References

gossei
Fish of Lake Malawi
Fish of Malawi
Fish described in 1973
Taxa named by Warren E. Burgess
Taxa named by Herbert R. Axelrod
Taxonomy articles created by Polbot